Mihir A. Desai is an Indian-American economist currently the Mizuho Financial Group Professor of Finance at Harvard Business School and Professor at Harvard Law School. He graduated from Brown University with a bachelor's degree of history and economics in 1989, earned an MBA (Baker Scholar) from Harvard Business School in 1993 and a PhD in Political Economy from Harvard University in 1998. 

Desai has testified to Joint Committees in Washington on international corporate taxation, as is quoted in the main financial papers on US corporate tax.

See also
 James R. Hines Jr.
 Dhammika Dharmapala
 Double Irish, Single Malt, and CAIA, BEPS tools

References

External links
 NBER Profile: Mihir A. Desai

Living people
Harvard Business School faculty
21st-century American economists
Harvard Business School alumni
Brown University alumni
1967 births
Corporate tax avoidance
Corporate taxation in the United States